This is a list of Arabs in Italy. It includes prominent and notable Arabs in Italy from various fields, such as business, science, entertainment, sports and fine arts.

Arts and entertainment

Actors and models 
 Adam Alexi-Malle (born 1964), actor, singer, dancer and musician
 Jonis Bascir (born 1960), actor and musician
 Rym Saidi Breidy (born 1986), topmodel and actress
 Afef Jnifen (born 1963), fashion model
 Margareth Madè (born 1982), model and actress

Musicians 
 Ghali Amdouni (born 1993), rapper
 Saba Anglana (born 1970), singer
 Malika Ayane (born 1984), singer
 Yusef Greiss (1899–1961), composer of classical music
 Ion (Omar Nguale Ilunga) (born 1984), rapper
 Amir Issaa (born 1978), rapper
 Nour-Eddine Lakhmari (born 1964), singer, choreographer and film director
 Alessandro Mahmoud (born 1992), singer
 Rancore (born 1989), rapper

Other 
 Jaber Alwan (born 1948), artist and painter
 Luca Guadagnino (born 1971), film director, producer, and screenwriter
 Fathi Hassan (born 1957), artist
 Omar Hassan (born 1987), artist
 Jamal Taslaq (born 1970), high-fashion designer

Literature 
 Cristina Ali Farah (born 1973), writer
 Randa Ghazy (born 1986), writer
 Tahar Lamri (born 1958), writer
 Ingy Mubiayi (born 1972), writer

Media and journalism 
 Rula Jebreal (born 1973), foreign policy analyst, journalist, novelist and screenwriter
 Amara Lakhous (born 1970), author, journalist and anthropologist
 Nahida Nakad (born 1960), TV reporter and journalist
 Michelle Nouri (born 1973), journalist and author
 Igiaba Scego (born 1974), journalist, writer
 Mohamed Zineddaine (born 1957), journalist

Politics 
 Magdi Allam (born 1952), journalist and politician
 Abdul Hadi Palazzi (born 1961), secretary general of the Italian Muslim Assembly
 Souad Sbai (born 1961), politician and writer
 Dacia Valent (1963–2015), politician

Sports

Association football 
 Ramzi Aya (born 1990), footballer
 Richard Basha (born 2002), footballer
 Salah Basha (born 2003), footballer
 Nebil Caidi (born 1988), footballer
 Walid Cheddira (born 1998), footballer
 Fahd El Bahja (born 1993), footballer
 Mattia El Hilali (born 1998), footballer
 Hamza El Kaouakibi (born 1998), footballer
 Badr El Ouazni (born 1991), footballer
 Stephan El Shaarawy (born 1992), footballer
 Yassine Ejjaki (born 1999), footballer
 Housem Ferchichi (born 1996), footballer
 Amine Ghazoini (born 2001), footballer
 Shadi Ghosheh (born 1987), footballer
 Yonese Hanine (born 1990), footballer
 Hamza Haoudi (born 2001), footballer
 Saber Hraiech (born 1995), footballer
 Hicham Kanis (born 1997), footballer
 Omar Khailoti (born 2001), footballer
 Jonis Khoris (born 1989), footballer
 Karim Laribi (born 1991), footballer
 Fabio Liverani (born 1976), football manager and former midfielder
 Amir Mahrous (born 1998), footballer
 Youssef Maleh (born 1998), footballer
 Adam Masina (born 1994), footballer
 Hachim Mastour (born 1998), footballer
 Shady Oukhadda (born 1999), footballer

Running 
 Ahmed Abdelwahed (born 1996), steeplechase runner
 Yassin Bouih (born 1996), middle-distance runner
 Migidio Bourifa (born 1969), long-distance runner
 Yassine El Fathaoui (born 1982), long-distance runner
 Ahmed El Mazoury (born 1990), long-distance runner
 Nadia Ejjafini (born 1977), long-distance runner
 Mostafa Errebbah (born 1971), long-distance runner
 Abdellah Haidane (born 1989), middle distance runner
 Dalia Kaddari (born 2001), sprinter
 Mohamed Laqouahi  (born 1978), long-distance runner
 Fatna Maraoui (born 1977), long-distance runner
 Yassine Rachik (born 1993), long-distance runner
 Marouan Razine (born 1991), long-distance runner
 Ashraf Saber (born 1973), athlete
 Najibe Salami (born 1985), long-distance runner
 Touria Samiri (born 1988), middle distance runner and steeplechase runner
 Laila Soufyane (born 1983), long-distance runner
 Ala Zoghlami (born 1994), middle-distance runner and steeplechaser
 Osama Zoghlami (born 1994), middle-distance runner and steeplechaser

Other 
 Iosra Abdelaziz (born 1999), artistic gymnast
 Zahra Bani (born 1989), javelin thrower
 Mustapha Haida (born 1988), Muay Thai kickboxer
 Mohamed Amine Kalem (born 1982), para table tennis player
 Alessio Sakara (born 1981), MMA fighter

Other 
 Simone Assemani (1752–1820), professor of Oriental languages in Padua
 Ali Ghaleb Himmat (born 1938), businessman
 Giuseppe Nahmad (1932–2012), art dealer

See also 
 List of Arab Americans

Arab
Italian
 
Arab